Skid Roper (born Richard Banke, October 19, 1954, in National City, California, United States) is an American musician, most active in the 1980s and early 1990s. He has recorded with several groups including the surf band The Evasions, but is best known for his work with Mojo Nixon between 1985 and 1989.

With Nixon, Roper served mainly as an instrumentalist. He commonly played instruments such as the washboard and the mandolin. Since parting ways with Nixon in 1989, Roper has released three solo albums. The first two albums had a much stronger country influence, and were considerably less raucous than his work with Nixon. Roper also formed a surf band called Skid Roper and the Shadowcasters. 

Roper's latest CD, Rock and Roll Part 3, was released in 2010. Ten years in the making, Roper plays guitar, mandolin, organ, harmonica, percussion and whistling, sings each track and wrote all but one song.

In 2012 Roper contributed new music to volume ten (One Way Ticket to Palookaville) and in 2013 to volume eleven (Hells Basement) of the compilation album series Staring at the Sun. In 2012 Roper became a member of the Hi-Tones, the backing combo for Andy Rasmussen, playing drums and mandolin on the 2013 album High & Lonesome: The Rise and Fall of Hilo.

Discography
Solo
 Trails Plowed Under (1989)
 Lydia's Cafe (1991)
 Rock and Roll Part 3 (2010)

With The Evasions
 Son of Surf! (1981)

With Mojo Nixon
 Mojo Nixon and Skid Roper (1985)
 Get Out Of My Way! (1986)
 Frenzy (1986)
 Bo-Day-Shus!!! (1987)
 Root Hog Or Die (1989)
 Unlimited Everything (1990)

With Action Andy and the Hi-Tones
 High and Lonesome: The Fall and Rise of Hilo (2013)

Charting singles

References

External links
 Skid Roper official web site
 [ Skid Roper All Music Guide Entry]

1954 births
Living people
People from National City, California
American multi-instrumentalists
American country musicians
Cowpunk musicians
Psychobilly musicians